Itoupava Central is a neighborhood of Blumenau, Santa Catarina, Brazil located on north zone of the River Itajai-Açu. The principal streets are Alex Borchardt, better known as Sunset (in Portuguese: Pôr do sol), Pedro Zimmermann and Gustavo Zimmermann. A small part of this neighborhood is subject to flooding. WEG Transmissão e Distribuição and VEDAX are the most important plants. Also noteworthy plants are: ABB Transformadores, Tecnoblu Your ID and Bebidas Max Willhelm. The neighborhood is the home to three well known craft breweries: Bierland, Container and Alles  Blau. Blumenau's regional airport (Quero-Quero) is located here. Ginástico Danceteria is the most important night club.

Blumenau
Neighbourhoods in Santa Catarina (state)